The Billboard Hot 100 is a chart that ranks the best-performing singles of the United States. Its data, published by Billboard magazine and compiled by Nielsen SoundScan, is based collectively on each single's weekly physical and digital sales, as well as airplay and streaming. At the end of a year, Billboard will publish an annual list of the 100 most successful songs throughout that year on the Hot 100 chart based on the information. For 2021, the list was published on December 2, calculated with data from  November 21, 2020 to November 13, 2021.

Billboard named Olivia Rodrigo the top Hot 100 artist of 2021, the youngest female artist to achieve this honor, and the first female artist since Katy Perry in 2014. Rodrigo placed four songs on the list, all in the top 40; the highest ranked of them, "Good 4 U", placed at number five.

Year-end list

See also
 2021 in American music
 List of Billboard Hot 100 number ones of 2021
 List of Billboard Hot 100 top-ten singles in 2021

References

United States Hot 100 Year end
Billboard charts
2021 in American music